The Delaney Barn is the barn of a former homestead located at 170 S. Chambers Road in Aurora, Colorado. It seems to be the only historic round barn surviving in Colorado today. Horses, dairy cattle and other livestock were raised on this farm. It serves as an important piece of early twentieth century architecture. Now part of the 160 acre DeLaney Historic District with restored farm buildings.

It was built c.1900.

See also
National Register of Historic Places listings in Arapahoe County, Colorado

References

External links 

 
 

Buildings and structures in Aurora, Colorado
Buildings and structures in Arapahoe County, Colorado
Agricultural buildings and structures on the National Register of Historic Places in Colorado
Round barns in Colorado
Historic districts on the National Register of Historic Places in Colorado
National Register of Historic Places in Arapahoe County, Colorado
Individually listed contributing properties to historic districts on the National Register in Colorado